Prickwillow Museum, formerly known as the Prickwillow Drainage Engine Museum, tells the story of the changing face of the Fens and its network of drainage systems and pumping stations.

The museum contains a major collection of large diesel pumping engines which have all been restored to working order.

Prickwillow Museum is funded and run by the Prickwillow Engine Trust, a registered charity, and has received funding from the Heritage Lottery Fund and The Ouse Washes Landscape Partnership.

For one weekend in the early autumn every year the museum hosts the Prickwillow ploughing festival.

See also
 Other land drainage engines that are now preserved as museums
Stretham Old Engine
Dogdyke Pumping Station
Wicken Fen
Cambridge Museum of Technology

References

External links
 Prickwillow Museum - official site
 Ouse Washes Landscape Partnership

Museums in Cambridgeshire
Local museums in Cambridgeshire
Technology museums in the United Kingdom
Industry museums in England
Former pumping stations
Buildings and structures in Cambridgeshire
Tourist attractions in Cambridgeshire
Industrial archaeological sites in England